The 2019 Intercontinental Cup (known as the 2019 Hero Intercontinental Cup for sponsorship reasons) was the second edition of the Intercontinental Cup, a 4-team association football tournament held at TransStadia Arena in the Indian city of Ahmedabad between the 7th and 19th of July 2019. The tournament was organized by the AIFF. 

North Korea won the title by a 1–0 victory over Tajikistan in the final.

Participating nations 
Though the tournament was supposed to be played by teams from different confederations, in this edition of the Intercontinental Cup all teams participating were from AFC only. All the four teams played each other in a round robin phase and the top two teams played the final.

The FIFA Rankings of participating national teams, as of 14 June 2019:
 (85)
 (101)
 (120)
 (122)

Venue
All matches held at the TransStadia Arena, Ahmedabad, India.

Matches
Times listed are UTC+05:30.

Match rules 
 90 minutes.
 Penalty shoot-out after a draw in 90 minutes.
 Maximum of six substitutions.

Round Robin

Final

Winners

Statistics

Goalscorers

Broadcasting rights

References

International association football competitions hosted by India
Sports competitions in Ahmedabad
Intercontinental Cup (India)
Intercontinental Cup (India)
Intercontinental Cup (India)